Kamal Das (born 2 May 1988) is an Indian cricketer. He made his first-class debut for Tripura in the 2011–12 Ranji Trophy on 3 November 2011.

References

External links
 

1988 births
Living people
Indian cricketers
Tripura cricketers
Place of birth missing (living people)